Government Street may refer to:

Canada
Government Street (Victoria, British Columbia)

United States
Government Street (Mobile, Alabama)